{{DISPLAYTITLE:C8H15NOS2}}
The molecular formula C8H15NOS2 (molar mass: 205.341 g/mol, exact mass: 205.0595 u) may refer to:

 Lipoamide
 6-(Methylsulfinyl)hexyl isothiocyanate

Molecular formulas